Tonica effractella is a moth in the family Depressariidae. It was described by Snellen in 1879. It is found in Australia, where it has been recorded from the Northern Territory, Queensland, New South Wales and Western Australia.

The wingspan is about 20 mm. The forewings are off-white with dark markings, including one on the tip. There are also areas of raised scales.

The larvae feed on Brachychiton paradoxum, Sterculia quadrifida and Gossypium hirsutum. They feed inside the growing shoots of their host plant.

References

Moths described in 1879
Tonica